Twelve Carat Toothache is the fourth studio album by American rapper and singer Post Malone. It was released on June 3, 2022, by Republic Records and Mercury Records. The album contains 14 tracks and includes guest appearances from Roddy Ricch, Doja Cat, Gunna, Fleet Foxes, the Kid Laroi, and the Weeknd. The deluxe edition was later released on June 7, 2022, including two new tracks, "Waiting For Never" and "Hateful".

Twelve Carat Toothache was supported by three singles: "One Right Now", "Cooped Up", and "I Like You (A Happier Song)". The album received generally positive reviews from critics and was a commercial success. It debuted at number two on the US Billboard 200, earning 121,000 album-equivalent units in its first week. The album is Post Malone's fourth top-five album in the US.

Background
On April 24, 2020, Post Malone announced that a new album is in progress during a live stream performance. On July 21, 2020, Malone was interviewed by The Wall Street Journal, in which he said: 

On April 23, 2021, his manager, Dre London, shared that he and Malone had agreed that he would release two projects in 2021, which however, did not happen. On January 10, 2022, London revealed that Twelve Carat Toothache had been completed and was ready to be released, but said that Republic Records and its parent label, Universal Music Group, had been delaying its release. 

On January 26, 2022, Malone was interviewed by Billboard. He felt that the songs on the album "speak more to how I'm feeling at the moment: the ups and downs and the disarray and the bipolar aspect of being an artist in the mainstream". American record producer Louis Bell, a close friend and frequent collaborator of Malone, felt that it blends "molten lava and fire" and "cyan blues and whites". Due to the COVID-19 pandemic, Malone was unable to go on tour, which gave him less incentive to make as much music. The album contains 14 songs and runs for 43 minutes, making it Malone's shortest album to date. Malone announced two additional songs "Waiting for Never" and "Hateful" for release on June 7.

Release and promotion
On April 11, 2022, Malone's manager Dre London announced via Instagram that the album would be released in May 2022. On April 23, 2022, Malone took to Instagram live, previewing some of the album's songs. Among those songs, he played "Love/Hate Letter to Alcohol", a collaboration with Fleet Foxes's Robin Pecknold, which details Post's' "struggle with alcohol". Malone said the band is one of his favorites, and praised Pecknold as "the most beautiful fucking vocalist". Post described "Wasting Angels", featuring the Kid Laroi, as being about "a celebration of life and a human spirit to be able to fight no matter what". He also previewed a song called "Wrapped Around Your Finger", as well as the Doja Cat-assisted "I Like You (A Happier Song)", which sees the two "playfully" going back and forth. On April 27, 2022, Malone announced that the album will be released on June 3, 2022. On May 14, 2022, he appeared as a musical guest on Saturday Night Live and performed "Cooped Up" with Roddy Ricch, as well as "Love/Hate Letter to Alcohol", joined by Fleet Foxes. Malone had previously confirmed that he had worked with Fleet Foxes frontman Robin Pecknold on a song for the album. Twelve Carat Toothache was released on June 3, 2022, through Mercury Records and Republic Records. The standard edition was released on cassette, CD, digital download, and streaming, with a pre-order for the vinyl release going live days later. The bonus tracks of deluxe edition, "Waiting for Never" and "Hateful", were released to streaming services on June 7, 2022.

Singles
On November 2, 2021, Malone and the Weeknd posted a 7-second snippet of the song titled "PM&TW-ORN-Update.5.nonhyped.w1.mp3" on their Instagram accounts. The post received over 150,000 likes in just an hour. While it was initially unknown what the title of the song was going to be, Malone's manager Dre London revealed that the collaboration would be titled "One Right Now". On November 5, 2021, Malone released "One Right Now" with the Weeknd, as the lead single from the album. The song marks the first time the artists appeared on a song together. The song was produced by Louis Bell, Brian Lee, and Andrew Bolooki. It debuted and peaked at number six on the Billboard Hot 100.

Malone released the album's second single, "Cooped Up" with Roddy Ricch, on May 12, 2022. It debuted and peaked at number 12 on the Billboard Hot 100.

"I Like You (A Happier Song)" featuring Doja Cat, was sent to US contemporary hit radio as the third single from the album on June 7, 2022. It debuted at number nine and peaked at number three on the Billboard Hot 100.

Tour
On June 13, 2022, to further promote the album, Post announced the North American leg of his upcoming concert tour, the Twelve Carat Tour. It began on September 10 in Omaha, Nebraska, and concluded on November 16 in Los Angeles, California. Roddy Ricch joined as the opening act on most dates.

Critical reception

Twelve Carat Toothache was met with generally positive reviews. At Metacritic, which assigns a normalized rating out of 100 to reviews from professional publications, the album received an average score of 68, based on 15 reviews. Aggregator AnyDecentMusic? gave it 5.6 out of 10, based on their assessment of the critical consensus.

Rhian Daly from NME enjoyed the album, saying, "The occasional outdated attitude and some light filler material here and there aside, Twelve Carat Toothache is another step up for Post Malone. It's a record that feels distinctively, inimitably him and succeeds in his goal of sharing his truth". Writing for The Daily Telegraph, Kathleen Johnston stated, "Despite what the polished sonics might suggest, Twelve Carat Toothache is an ambitious record with real range, proving that Post has found his groove as America's kaleidoscopic king of new-era pop". Jon Caramanica of The New York Times praised the album, stating, "Some of Post Malone's brightest sounds to date: "Wrapped Around Your Finger" has 1950s sweetness and 1980s syntheticness, and "I Cannot Be (a Sadder Song)" has a bubbly undertow that recalls some of the squeakiest K-pop. "One Right Now", with the Weeknd, is more zippy dyspepsia. But even the chirpy moments don't detract from the album's tonal consistency". In a positive review, Varietys Chris Willman said, "Twelve Carat Toothache finally feels like a transitional album for one of pop's biggest stars. (And we do mean pop, not hip-hop) ... But with no small help from Bell, who's the best kind of musical enabler, Malone's turns of melodic phrase and aptitude for true confessions are making him a far more interesting artist than we could have guessed even a couple of albums ago". AllMusic's Neil Z. Yeung wrote, "While the rap-preferring fans will still gravitate to his first two efforts, listeners with an appreciative ear for his genre-sampling maturation into the mainstream will find Twelve Carat Toothache to be a fascinating emotional exploration of a conflicted artist who can't help but churn out star-making hits at the expense of his own happiness". Maura Johnston of Rolling Stone said, "His fourth album is full of big-name cameos, sweeping gestures, and pensive vibes".

In his review, Matthew Strauss of Pitchfork states, "Post Malone's fourth studio album is slick, streamlined, and a little less vulgar and ostentatious than his earlier work—a sign that he's taking himself more seriously, for better or worse". Beats Per Minute critic JT Early said, "Don't let the sparkly façade fool you – Post isn't afraid to let you know he's just as much a human being, with all its accompanying messes and drama, as the rest of us". In a mixed review, Clashs Robin Murray stated, "Neither one thing or another, the lack of definition on the project results in something quietly rebellious, but curiously unsatisfying". Mackenzie Cummings-Grady of HipHopDX said, "Lukewarm contributions from Doja Cat, the Kid Laroi, Roddy Ricch and others can't help Post Malone get out of the quicksand. He continues to be pulled in an obvious direction of glitzy Hollywood stardom but instead, maintains a chokehold on comfortability". Reviewing the album for Consequence, Paolo Ragusa stated, "Twelve Carat Toothache feels thrown together and incomplete. Post Malone did himself a favor by limiting the run time of the LP, but if he's championing quality over quantity, the quality has to be more incisive, specific, vulnerable, and holistic".

Commercial performance
Twelve Carat Toothache debuted at number two on the US Billboard 200 with 121,000 album-equivalent units, including 21,000 pure album sales. Its tracks earned a total of 127.82 million on-demand streams. The album is Post Malone's fourth top-five album in the US.

Track listing

Personnel
Musicians
 Post Malone – vocals (all tracks), drums (2), programming (3, 7, 8, 10–12, 14, 16), bass (4), acoustic guitar (8)
 Louis Bell – programming (1–16), drums (2, 8, 13); keyboards, synthesizer (8, 13); bass (8), choir arrangement (9); synth bass, synth pads (13)
 Charlie Handsome – programming (3)
 Brian Lee – violin (3), programming (13)
 Andrew Watt – guitar (4)
 Omer Fedi – guitar (4)
 Jasper Harris – programming (5)
 Doja Cat – vocals (5)
 Gunna – rap vocals (6)
 Robin Pecknold – acoustic guitar (8)
 Dana Nielsen – background vocals, choir arrangement (9)
 Charissa Nielsen – background vocals (9)
 India Carney – background vocals (9)
 Jonathan Mouton – background vocals (9)
 The Kid Laroi – rap vocals (9)
 The Weeknd – vocals (13)
 Andrew Bolooki – programming, synthesizer (13)
 Taurus – programming (6)
 Bryvn – programming (15, 16)
 Frankie XY – programming (15)
 Hector Soundz – programming (15)

Technical

 Mike Bozzi – mastering (1–16)
 Manny Marroquin – mixing (1–13)
 Louis Bell – mixing (14–16), engineering (1–16), vocal production (all tracks), editing (14)
 Chris Dennis – engineering (1–6, 8–10, 12)
 Nick McMullen – engineering (1, 3, 10, 15, 16)
 Andrew Bolooki – engineering (5)
 Post Malone – engineering (14)
 Anthony Vilchis – mixing assistance (1–12)
 Chris Galland – mixing assistance (1–12)
 Trey Station – mixing assistance (1–12)
 Zach Pereyra – mixing assistance (1–12)
 Elijah Ibarra – engineering assistance (1, 5)
 Christian Amadeus – engineering assistance (2, 4, 7)
 Shane Moloney – engineering assistance (3, 4, 7)
 Mate Gere – engineering assistance (5, 9)
 Joey Mora – engineering assistance (7)

Charts

Weekly charts

Year-end charts

Certifications

Release history

References

2022 albums
Albums produced by Louis Bell
Post Malone albums
Albums produced by Post Malone
Dance-pop albums by American artists
Albums produced by Andrew Watt (record producer)
Albums produced by Omer Fedi
Mercury Records albums
Republic Records albums